is a former Japanese football player and manager currently manager WE League club of MyNavi Sendai Ladies.

Playing career
Matsuda was born in Tokyo on October 13, 1961. After graduating from Nihon University, he played for Fujitsu from 1984 to 1990.

Coaching career
After retirement, Matsuda started coaching career at Verdy Kawasaki (later Tokyo Verdy) in 1992. He mainly coached youth team and Verdy's women team Nippon TV Beleza. He managed Beleza twice and he led Beleza to L.League champions 4 years in a row (2005–2008). He also managed Verdy from October 2009. In 2010, he moved to Japan Football League (JFL) club Gainare Tottori. He led Gainare to JFL champions and Gainare was promoted to J2 League. However the club finished at the 19th place of 20 clubs in 2011 season in J2 and he resigned end of the season. In 2012, he signed with JFL club FC Ryukyu. In 2013, he signed with L.League Division 2 club AS Elfen Saitama. He led Elfen to the 2nd place in 2013 and Elfen was promoted to Division 1. In 2015, he moved to L.League club INAC Kobe Leonessa. INAC won the champions 2015 and 2016 Empress's Cup. In 2018, he moved to Regional Leagues club Tochigi Uva FC and served as assistant coach. In 2019, he signed with J3 League club Fukushima United FC and served as a manager.

Managerial statistics
Update; December 31, 2018

References

External links

1961 births
Living people
Nihon University alumni
Association football people from Tokyo
Japanese footballers
Japan Soccer League players
Kawasaki Frontale players
Japanese football managers
J2 League managers
J3 League managers
Tokyo Verdy managers
Nippon TV Tokyo Verdy Beleza managers
Gainare Tottori managers
FC Ryukyu managers
Fukushima United FC managers
Association footballers not categorized by position